This is a list of the Ukraine national football team results from 2010 to 2019.

Fixtures and results

2010

2011

2012

2013

2014

2015

2016

2017

2018

2019

Notes

References

External links

Ukraine national football team results
2010s in Ukrainian sport